Puerto Rico Highway 505 (PR-505) is a tertiary state highway in Ponce, Puerto Rico.

Route description
PR-505 runs north to south, in a general SSE direction, and mostly alongside Bayagán River in barrio Machuelo Arriba. Its southern terminus is at its intersection with PR-14, near PR-10 and PR-139. The road connects Barrio San Patricio to the urban area of city of Ponce.

Communities served
The road and serves the communities of La Mocha, Montes Llanos, and Hogares Seguros, among others. The community of "La Yuca" is also on PR-505, at km 11.3, in the jurisdiction of Barrio Machuelo Arriba.

Major intersections

See also

List of highways in Ponce, Puerto Rico
List of highways numbered 505

References

External links
 
 Guía de Carreteras Principales, Expresos y Autopistas 

505
Roads in Ponce, Puerto Rico